Robert Clements, 1st Earl of Leitrim (25 November 1732 – 27 July 1804) was an Irish nobleman and politician.

Son of Cavan Borough MP Nathaniel Clements, Deputy Vice Treasurer and Teller of the Irish Exchequer, Clements served as High Sheriff of Leitrim in 1759, having been the previous year appointed as Controller of the Great and Small Customs for the Port of Dublin.

In 1765, he was elected to the Irish House of Commons for Donegal County, exchanging this seat for that of Carrick in 1768. In the former year he also married Lady Elizabeth Skeffington, eldest daughter of Clotworthy Skeffington, 1st Earl of Massereene. He was subsequently Commissioner of the Revenue between 1772 and 1773, and three years later returned MP for Donegal County again.

Having been appointed governor of Counties Leitrim and Donegal in 1777 and 1781 respectively, Clements was ennobled as Baron Leitrim, of Manor Hamilton, in 1783. He was subsequently created Viscount Leitrim in 1794, and Earl of Leitrim in 1795. In 1801, he was elected as one of the original Irish representative peers, and was admitted to the Irish Privy Council the following year.

Lord Leitrim died aged 71 in London, and was buried in Dublin.

References

|-

|-

1732 births
1804 deaths
Peers of Ireland created by George III
Irish MPs 1761–1768
Irish MPs 1769–1776
Irish MPs 1776–1783
Members of the Irish House of Lords
Irish representative peers
High Sheriffs of Leitrim
Politicians from County Leitrim
Members of the Privy Council of Ireland
Members of the Parliament of Ireland (pre-1801) for County Donegal constituencies
Members of the Parliament of Ireland (pre-1801) for County Leitrim constituencies
Robert
1